Holland Park West busway station is located in Brisbane, Australia serving the suburb of Holland Park West. It opened on 30 April 2001 when the South East Busway was extended from Woolloongabba to Eight Mile Plains.

It is served by seven routes operated by Brisbane Transport and Clarks Logan City Bus Service as part of the TransLink network.

A bus stop for local services is situated on Sterculia Avenue directly beneath the busway platforms. The station also features bicycle storage lockers and kiss & ride drop off facilities.

References

External links
[ Holland Park West station] TransLink

Bus stations in Brisbane
Holland Park, Queensland
Transport infrastructure completed in 2001